Stig Westergaard (born 16 September 1963 in Esbjerg) is a Danish Olympic sailor in the Finn and Soling classes. Westergaard competed in the 1992 and 1996 Summer Olympics.

He has twice sailed the Volvo Ocean Race; in 2001–02 on Djuice Dragons and in 2008–09 on Kosatka.

He is the brother of Bjørn Westergaard. His son Magnus Westergaard is a professional footballer.

References

Danish male sailors (sport)
Olympic sailors of Denmark
Finn class sailors
Sailors at the 1992 Summer Olympics – Finn
Sailors at the 1996 Summer Olympics – Soling
Volvo Ocean Race sailors
Finn class world champions
World champions in sailing for Denmark
1963 births
Living people
Soling class world champions
People from Esbjerg
Sportspeople from the Region of Southern Denmark